Kabul, capital of Afghanistan, fell in November 2001 to the Northern Alliance forces during the War in Afghanistan. Northern Alliance forces began their attack on the city on 13 November and made swift progress against Taliban forces that were heavily weakened by American and British air strikes. The advance moved ahead of plans, and the next day the Northern Alliance forces (supported by ODA 555) entered Kabul and met no resistance inside the city. Taliban forces retreated to Kandahar in the south.

Coupled with the fall of Mazar-i-Sharif five days earlier, the capture of Kabul was a significant blow to Taliban control of Afghanistan. As a result of all the losses, surviving members of the Taliban and al-Qaeda retreated toward Kandahar, the spiritual birthplace and home of the Taliban movement, and Tora Bora.

Background

By late 2001, the Taliban had seized control of approximately 90% of the country during the 1996-2001 Afghan Civil War, and with the death of Northern Alliance general Ahmad Shah Massoud there were concerns the entire country would fall under their control. Their fighters consisted of between 25,000 and 30,000 fighters, and were supported by other groups including between 2000 and 3000 Arab fighters in Osama Bin Laden's 055 Brigade.

On 10 September, the Bush Administration agreed to plan to oust the Taliban should they refuse to hand over Osama Bin Laden. Following the September 11 Attacks, on 14 September, the United States demanded that the Taliban surrender all known al-Qaeda associates, provide intelligence on bin Laden and his affiliates, and expel all terrorists from Afghanistan.

On 7 October, after the Taliban failed to hand over bin Laden, the United States began their bombing campaign, and over the next month Northern Alliance forces, supported by US Special Forces and airstrikes, advanced across the country, capturing several key cities.

On 12 November, a brief battle took place on Shamali Plain between the Taliban and the Northern Alliance north of Kabul. For two years during the Afghan Civil War the frontline had been stalemated here, but with the Taliban demoralized by the fall of the northern cities, under constant attack by American air support, and fearing encirclement, they fell back to Kabul following just three hours of fighting, opening the road to the city. Following the battle, the Taliban forces in Kabul evacuated the city, emptying the national treasury but in their haste leaving behind weapons and other possessions.

Fall of Kabul
Discussions had been held between the Northern Alliance and various foreign governments, including the United States, Britain, and Pakistan, about the possible seizure of Kabul, with the American Secretary of State Colin Powell expressing that the foreign governments would prefer the alliance invest the city and not seize it, in order to improve the ability to form a broad and successful post-war government. The response to this pressure varied; some spokesmen agreed to this, while others suggested that they would push on to Kabul and on 12 November, as alliance forces neared the city, the British Prime Minister Tony Blair expressed his expectation that alliance commanders would honour their commitment and not seize the city.

Initially the alliance held back from the city, with security guards being seen holding back armour and truckloads of infantry, but this pause was short-lived, and the alliance proved unable or unwilling to prevent their forces from entering the city.

Aftermath
With the fall of the city, there were some incidents of vengeance against the Taliban; the BBC's John Simpson reported hearing chants of "kill the Taliban" from the inhabitants of Kabul as he entered the city, with many Taliban fighters, particularly foreign fighters from the Arab Peninsula and Pakistan, being lynched and left in ditches while others were beaten with rifles and fists after their capture.

The liberation from the Taliban also resulted in the practice of behaviours formerly prohibited; the "great Afghan passion" of kite flying, which the Taliban had tried to stamp out, was taken up again, music was played, and young men lined up at street barbers to cut off the beard the Taliban had forced them to wear – though most would choose to keep it.

The fall of the city to the alliance did bring concerns about the long-lasting stability in the country. The alliance primarily consisted of minority ethnic groups within Afghanistan; Uzbeks, Tajiks, and Hazaras, while the Taliban was dominated by the majority ethnic group, the Pashtuns, and it was feared that the seizure of the city would make it more difficult to form a broad and inclusive coalition that would bring stability to the nation, particularly if the Taliban position in the south did not collapse and they continued to fight on as a guerrilla force.

References

Afghanistan conflict (1978–present)
2001 in Afghanistan
Conflicts in 2001
History of Kabul
2001 in Kabul
Battles of the War in Afghanistan (2001–2021)
Military operations of the War in Afghanistan (2001–2021) involving the United States
November 2001 events in Asia
Battles in 2001